The 2003 CAF Champions League Final was at the end of the 2003 CAF Champions League.

It was a football tie held over two legs in December 2003 between Ismaily  of Egypt, and Enyimba of Nigeria.

Enyimba won the final with aggregate score of 2-1 and became the 1st Nigerian club to win the cup.

Qualified teams
In the following table, finals until 1996 were in the African Cup of Champions Club era, since 1997 were in the CAF Champions League era.

Venues

Enyimba International Stadium
Enyimba International Stadium is a multi-use stadium in Aba, Nigeria.  It is currently used mostly for football matches. It serves as a home ground of Enyimba International F.C. The stadium holds 16,000 people after the installation of seats.

It currently has a semi-artificial lawn of a high standard.

Ismailia Stadium
Ismailia Stadium is located in Ismailia, Egypt, and has a total capacity of 18,525. It is used by Ismaily SC, and was one of the stadiums used in the African competitions.

Road to final

Format
The final was decided over two legs, with aggregate goals used to determine the winner. If the sides were level on aggregate after the second leg, the away goals rule would have been applied, and if still level, the tie would have proceeded directly to a penalty shootout (no extra time is played).

Matches

First leg

Second leg

Notes and references

External links
2003 CAF Champions League - cafonline.com

Final
2003
1
Enyimba FC matches
Ismaily SC matches
2003–04 in Egyptian football
2003–04 in Nigerian football